This is a list of notable alumni and students, from the University of Coimbra.

Alumni

Noted professors and lecturers

Nobel laureates
Egas Moniz (1874–1955), physician and neurologist;  1949 Nobel Prize in Medicine or Physiology

Others
José Bonifácio de Andrade e Silva (1763–1838), Brazilian statesman and naturalist
Félix Avelar Brotero (1744–1828), botanist and professor
George Buchanan (1506–1582), a Scottish historian and humanist scholar, professor at the Colegio de la Artes
Luís Wittnich Carrisso (1886-1937), botanist, professor
António Castanheira Neves (1929), legal philosopher and professor emeritus at the law faculty
Fernão Lopes de Castanheda (1500–1559), historian, bedel and archivist
André de Gouveia (1497–1548), head teacher, humanist and pedagogue
Alexandre Rodrigues Ferreira (1756–1815), naturalist
Eduardo Lourenço (born 1923), professor, essayist, critic, philosopher, and writer
Pedro Nunes (1502–1578), mathematician
Sidónio Pais (1872–1918), politician; President in 1918; military; professor of mathematics
Carlos Mota Pinto (1936–1985), Prime Minister
António de Oliveira Salazar (1889–1970), politician; Prime Minister; Dictator of Portugal, 1932-1968
Fernando Távora (1923–2004), architect and professor
Domenico Vandelli (1735–1816), Italian naturalist

Noted attendees
Noted persons who graduated from or otherwise attended the university include:

Zeca Afonso (1929–1987), singer, songwriter and poet; left-winger whose music is considered a symbol of the Carnation Revolution
Manuel Alegre (1936), poet; politician; member of the Socialist Party (did not graduate)
António José de Almeida (1866–1929), politician, President, founder of Lisbon and Porto universities
Nicolau Tolentino de Almeida (1740–1811), foremost Portuguese satirical poet of the 18th century
José de Anchieta (1534–1597), jesuit missionary, apostle of Brazil, writer and poet
José Alberto de Oliveira Anchieta (1832–1897), 19th century explorer and naturalist (did not graduate)
Leão Ramos Ascensão (1903–1980), integralist politician and writer
Manuela Azevedo (1970), singer
João Botelho (1949), film director (did not graduate)
Luís de Almeida Braga, (1890–1970), integralist politician and writer
Teófilo Braga (1843–1924), politician, President, writer and playwright
Luís Vaz de Camões, (c. 1524–1580), considered Portugal's greatest poet (did not graduate)
Jorge Chaminé (b, 1956), baritone; Human Rights Medal from the UN; Goodwill Ambassador of Music in ME (Music in the Middle East)
José Cid (1942), singer and composer (did not graduate)
Christopher Clavius (1538–1612), German mathematician and astronomer; main architect of the modern Gregorian calendar
Narana Coissoró (1933), lawyer and politician
Fausto Correia (1951–2007), politician; member of the Portuguese Parliament and the Government of Portugal; member of the Parliament of the European Union
João de Deus (1830–1896), poet (did not graduate)
Bishop James Warren Doyle (1786–1834), Bishop of Kildare and Leighlin in Ireland, studied for his doctorate in Coimbra
Vergílio Ferreira (1916–1996), writer and teacher
Armindo Freitas-Magalhães (1966), psychologist and researcher, working on the psychology of the human smile
Almeida Garrett (1799–1854), romanticist and writer
Manuel Teixeira Gomes (1860–1941), political figure (did not graduate)
Ruy Luís Gomes (1905–1984), mathematician
João Mário Grilo (1958), film director (did not graduate)
Miguel Guedes (1972), musician, songwriter and singer
Gregório de Matos e Guerra (1636-1696), poet and lawyer
Bartolomeu de Gusmão (1685–1724), naturalist, recalled for his early work on lighter-than-air ship design
Artur Jorge (1946), football coach and former football player (did not graduate at this university but at the University of Lisbon)
Guerra Junqueiro (1850–1923), lawyer, politician, member of the Portuguese House of Representatives, journalist, author and poet
Valentim Loureiro (1938), military major, politician, mayor, former football club chairman (did not graduate)
Fábio Lucindo (1985-), Brazilian voice actor, best-known for his work in anime.
Bernardino Machado (1851–1944), politician, President
Marquês de Pombal (1699–1782), Prime Minister to King Joseph I of Portugal throughout his reign
Aristides Sousa Mendes (1885–1954), diplomat, known for protecting European Jews as a consul in France during World War II against government orders
Luís Marques Mendes, (1957), politician; former leader of the Social Democratic Party
Manoel da Nóbrega, (1517–1570), jesuit priest; first Provincial of the Society of Jesus in colonial Brazil; influential in the early history of Brazil; participated in the founding of several cities
António Nobre (1867–1900), poet (did not graduate)
Adriano Correia de Oliveira (1942–1982), musician, famous singer and composer of politically engaged folk music in the 1960s-70s (did not graduate)
Carlos de Oliveira (1921–1981), poet and novelist
Álvaro Santos Pereira (1972), economist and professor
Eça de Queiroz (1845–1900), novelist, one of the leading intellectuals of the Generation of 1870
Antero de Quental (1842–1891), poet, philosopher, political activist
José Hipólito Raposo (1885–1953), integralist politician and writer
José Adriano Pequito Rebelo (1892–1983), integralist politician and writer
Maria de Belém Roseira (1949), politician (member of the Socialist Party, former minister)
António de Almeida Santos (1926), politician and minister
Fernando Machado Soares (1930), fado singer, author, judge
Miguel Torga, pseudonym  of Adolfo Correia da Rocha (1907–1995), writer, poet and physician
João Maria Tudela (1929), singer, musician and entertainer (did not graduate)
Salgado Zenha (1923–1993), left-wing politician and lawyer

References

University of Coimbra
 
Coimbra, University of